Three foot gauge railways have a track gauge of  or 1 yard. This gauge is a narrow gauge and is generally found throughout North, Central, and South America. In Ireland, many secondary and industrial lines were built to  gauge, and it is the dominant gauge on the Isle of Man, where it is known as the Manx Standard Gauge. Modern  gauge railways are most commonly found in isolated mountainous areas, on small islands, or in large-scale amusement parks and theme parks (see table below). This gauge is also popular in model railroading (particularly in G scale), and model prototypes of these railways have been made by several model train brands around the world, such as Accucraft Trains (US), Aristo-Craft Trains (US), Bachmann Industries (Hong Kong), Delton Locomotive Works (US), LGB (Germany), and PIKO (Germany).

Railways

See also

Heritage railway
Large amusement railways
List of track gauges
Swedish three foot gauge railways

References